The Pedra da Boca State Park is a state park in the state of Paraíba, Brazil.
It contains a group of unusual rocky outcrops surrounded by cerrado vegetation. One of the rocks has a large collection of prehistoric rock paintings, and is also a site of religious services for devotees of Our Lady of Fátima.

Location

The Pedra da Boca State Park is in the municipality of Araruna, Paraíba, in the Curimataú Oriental microregion.
It lies in the foothills between the Serra da Confusão and the Serra de Araruna.
The park is in the basin of the Calabouço River, an intermittent tributary of the Curimataú River that forms the border between Paraíba and Rio Grande do Norte and is an important source of water for the local population.

The Pedra da Boca State Park was created by state governor José Targino Maranhão by decree 20.889 of 7 February 2000.
Soon after the park was created the land was expropriated and families living in the park were compensated.

Environment

The Köppen climate classification is Bsh: semi-arid, hot and dry, with a short rainy season in the autumn and winter.
The vegetation is in the caatinga biome.
Vegetation includes primitive shrubs and trees, with small remnants of montane forest.
It has been strongly affected by extraction of wood, cattle grazing and agriculture.
The water resources of the Calabouço basin have been badly managed.
The riparian forest is devastated, the soil is impoverished and the river bed is silted.

There is significant biodiversity, with an estimated 21 species of reptiles and amphibians, 16 of mammals and 125 of plants.
The main species of flora are Anadenanthera peregrina, Myracrodruon urundeuva, Syagrus comosa, Ficus species, Hymenaea courbaril, Tocoyena brasiliensis, Ziziphus joazeiro, Libidibia ferrea, Mimosa acustitipula, Mimosa tenuiflora, Chloroleucon foliolosum, Bromelia laciniosa, Cereus jamacaru, Bauhinia cheilanta, Combretum leprosum, Erythrina velutina, Guazuma ulmifolia, Handroanthus chrysotrichus, Talisia esculenta, Sisalana perrine, Spondias tuberosa, Pilosocereus gounellei, Aspidosperma pyrifolium, Melocactus bahiensis, Schinopsis brasiliensis, Spondias tuberosa, Croton sincorensis and Pilosocereus squamosus.

Rock formations

The park contains a set of rocks of porphyritic granite composition, with traces of gneisses and quartzites.
The outcrops have rounded faces and extensive vertical corrugations from the ground to their summits.
Other dramatic outcrops include the Pedra da Caveira (Pedra do Anselmo), Pedra do RN, Pedra do Carneiro and Pedra do Letreiro.
The Pedra do Letreiro, also known as the Pedra da Santa, has a large collection of hieroglyph rock paintings of the northeast tradition, attributed to the Tarairiu and Paiacu people who formerly lived in the region, members of the great Kiriri nation known as Tapuias.

Visiting

The park receives about 1,200 visitors per month, mainly in the high season of summer.
The park attracts scholars, tourists and visitors who love nature and adventure sports.
There is an ecological trail that takes about three hours for active people, with some climbing involved. Use of ropes is required in some places. 
This visits all the formations, and passes a spring of water, specimens of forest and a variety of birds and reptiles.
Visitors may also practice rappelling and climbing on the rocks as well as mountain biking and paragliding.
As of 2007 there was a shortage of infrastructure and of an effective plan to preserve the environment from damage by visitors.
The park lacked signs and educational material to make the visitors aware of the importance of conservation.

Religious use

On the 13th of every month, particularly in May, thousands of devotees from the region and from further afield come to open air masses. 
The politician Celso Lisboa (1909–90) built an altar in the cave of the Pedra da Santa dedicated to Our Lady of Fatima.
It became impossible to use this place due to bees living on the huge rock, and for a period outdoor masses were held by the chapel near the park.
The state government then built the Sanctuary of Our Lady of Fatima near the Pedra da Santa in the form of a Greek arena with a capacity of about 5,000 and facilities that include bathrooms, cafeteria, offices and accommodation for the pilgrims.

Notes

Sources

State parks of Brazil
Protected areas established in 2000
2000 establishments in Brazil
Protected areas of Paraíba